Peter Brenchley (23 October 1936 – 23 April 1991) was an Australian rules footballer who played for Melbourne in the Victorian Football League (VFL) during the late 1950s.

Despite managing only 29 games of league football, Brenchley played in two premiership sides. In each of his three seasons he appeared in a Grand Final, winning flags in 1957 and 1959. Such was Melbourne's strength in this era that Brenchley finished on a losing team in only four games.

After leaving Melbourne, Brenchley moved to South Australia and played with Norwood in the South Australian National Football League during 1960 and 1961. He then returned to Victoria and played with Waverley in the Victorian Football Association for five seasons, where he won a premiership in 1965. In August 1966, Brenchley retired after he was suspended for the rest of the 1966 season plus twelve matches in 1967 for charging, striking and using abusive language towards field umpire David Jackson. He made a comeback in 1970 for Camberwell and coached there until 1971.

References

External links

DemonWiki profile

1936 births
Australian rules footballers from Victoria (Australia)
Melbourne Football Club players
Norwood Football Club players
Waverley Football Club players
Camberwell Football Club players
Camberwell Football Club coaches
Ormond Amateur Football Club players
1991 deaths
Melbourne Football Club Premiership players
Two-time VFL/AFL Premiership players